Enrique Barragán (born 4 October 1934) is a Uruguayan former sports shooter. He competed in the 50 metre pistol event at the 1968 Summer Olympics.

References

1934 births
Living people
Uruguayan male sport shooters
Olympic shooters of Uruguay
Shooters at the 1968 Summer Olympics
People from Mercedes, Uruguay
20th-century Uruguayan people